Resurrection: Return of the Black Dragon is a video game developed by Spanish developer Nebula Entertainment. It was published by Dinamic Multimedia.

Gry Online liked the diverse range of characters. Bonusweb felt it was a failed attempt at making a more varied version of Rune.

References

External links

2000 video games
Fantasy video games
Hack and slash games
Video games developed in Spain
Windows games
Windows-only games
Dinamic Multimedia games